Matvey Genrikhovich Manizer (– 20 December 1966) was a prominent Russian sculptor.  Manizer created a number of works that became classics of socialist realism.

Life 

Manizer was born in Saint Petersburg into the family of Genrikh Manizer, a prominent Memel-born artist of Baltic German descent.

As a student Manizer attended the Saint Petersburg State Artistic and Industrial Academy, and the art school of the Peredvizhniki from 1911 through 1916.  From 1926 he was a member of the Association of Artists of Revolutionary Russia.  In 1941 he moved to Moscow.

Working in an academic and realistic style, Manizer produced a great number of monuments situated throughout the Soviet Union, including some twelve portrayals of Lenin.  Manizer was awarded the People's Artist of the USSR (1958), Member of USSR Academy of Arts (1947), vice president of USSR Academy of Arts (1947-1966), chairman of the Saint Petersburg Union of Artists from 1937 to 1941, and three-time laureate of the Stalin Prize.

Manizer's wife  (1890-1971) was also sculptor, with her work at Moscow Metro's Dinamo station.  Their son,  (1927-2016), was a noted painter.  Among Manizer's students was the Stalin Prize-winning Fuad Abdurakhmanov.

Manizer is buried in Moscow's Novodevichy Cemetery.

Work 

A 1925 work commemorating Soviet politician V. Volodarsky.
 , Frunzensky District, Saint Petersburg. A 1932 work commemorating those who died in the 1905 Bloody Sunday massacre.
 Monument to Vasily Chapaev, Samara. A 1932 multi-figure and equestrian sculptural composition commemorating Red Army commander Vasily Chapayev.
 , Minsk, 1933.
 80 bronzes of Soviet citizens for the Moscow Metro station Ploshchad Revolyutsii, 1938
 , Kharkiv, Ukraine. A 1935 multi-figure sculptural composition commemorating Ukrainian poet and humanist Taras Shevchenko.
 Monument to Valerian Kuybyshev in Samara, 1938
 Monument to Lenin in Ulyanovsk, 1941, for which Manizer was awarded the Stalin Prize second class
 Bronze sculptures of the Heroes of the Soviet Union Matvey Kuzmin and Zoya Kosmodemyanskaya in the Moscow Metro station Partizanskaya, 1943, for which Manizer was awarded the Stalin Prize first class
 Monument to the Metro Builders, in the Moscow Metro station Elektrozavodskaya, 1944
  in Novosibirsk. A 1949 work commemorating twice-Hero of the Soviet Union Alexander Pokryshkin.
 Monument to Ivan Pavlov in Ryazan, 1950, for which Manizer was awarded the Stalin Prize second class
Monument to Lenin outside Luzhniki Stadium. A version of his 1940 Ulyanovsk monument to Lenin built for the 1958 World's Fair in Brussels, placed outside the Central Lenin Stadium in 1960.
 , Bolotnaya Square, Moscow. A 1958 work commemorating painter Ilya Repin.
 Heroes Monument, Jakarta. A 1963 work commemorating those who fought for Indonesian Independence.
 , Leningrad. A version of his 1932 work, made in 1933 and installed in 1968.

References 
 online biography from Saint Petersburg Encyclopedia
 online biography (Russian language)

1891 births
1966 deaths
Artists from Saint Petersburg
People's Artists of the USSR (visual arts)
Soviet sculptors
Full Members of the USSR Academy of Arts
Burials at Novodevichy Cemetery
Soviet painters
Baltic German people from the Russian Empire
Stalin Prize winners
Recipients of the Order of Lenin
Saint Petersburg Stieglitz State Academy of Art and Design alumni
Saint Petersburg State University alumni